DiNardo or Di Nardo is the surname of:

 Angelo Raffaele Dinardo (1932-2015), Italian politician
 Antonio Di Nardo (born 1979)
 Antonio Di Nardo (footballer, born 1998), Italian footballer
 Daniel DiNardo (born 1949), American Roman Catholic cardinal and archbishop
 Gerry DiNardo (born 1952), American former football player and coach
 Larry DiNardo (born 1949), American former football player
 Lenny DiNardo (born 1979), American former baseball pitcher
 Nancy DiNardo (born 1949–1950), American politician
 Pietro Di Nardo (born 1990), Swiss footballer

See also
 Mariotto di Nardo (fl. 1388–1424), Florentine painter